The xx, an English indie pop band, have released three studio albums, one remix album, five extended plays, 12 singles and 10 music videos.

Albums

Studio albums

Remix albums

Extended plays

Singles

Other charted songs

Guest appearances

Remixes

Songwriting and production credits

Music videos

Notes

References

External links
 
 
 
 

Discographies of British artists
Pop music group discographies